Penicillium cavernicola is a psychrotolerant fungus species of the genus of Penicillium which is found in cool caves.

See also
List of Penicillium species

References

cavernicola
Fungi described in 2004